F-22 is a series of combat flight simulation video games from NovaLogic for IBM PC compatibles.

Games

See also
Jetfighter (series), a series of combat flight simulators.

References

External links 
 F-22 at MobyGames

1996 video games
Combat flight simulators
Cooperative video games
DOS games
Multiplayer online games
Embracer Group franchises
Video games developed in the United States
Windows games